Andreas Langer (born 13 October 1956) is a German former skier. He competed in the Nordic combined event at the 1984 Winter Olympics.

References

External links
 

1956 births
Living people
German male Nordic combined skiers
Olympic Nordic combined skiers of East Germany
Nordic combined skiers at the 1984 Winter Olympics
People from Erzgebirgskreis
Sportspeople from Saxony